John Havelock Parker, OC (February 2, 1929 – March 9, 2020) was the commissioner of the Northwest Territories from April 15, 1979 to July 31, 1989. He had previously been Deputy Commissioner of Northwest Territories from 1967 to 1979.

Biography
From 1959 until 1963 he became an alderman for the Yellowknife town council. In 1963, he became the mayor of Yellowknife, which he held until February 1967. While serving as mayor he was appointed to the Carrothers Commission which led to the formation of responsible government in the Northwest Territories and later the division that led to Nunavut.

His later work helped in defining the border between the NWT and Nunavut and his name was given to a protrusion known as Parker's Notch as well as Parker Line.

In 1986, he was made an Officer of the Order of Canada for his "significant contributions to the evolution and development both of the municipal government of Yellowknife and of the territorial government."

Parker died March 9, 2020, in Sidney, British Columbia, where he had been living.

References

External links
Government of Northwest Territories past Commissioners
John Parker fonds. Northwest Territories Archives

1929 births
2020 deaths
Commissioners of the Northwest Territories
Officers of the Order of Canada
Members of the Legislative Assembly of the Northwest Territories
Northwest Territories Deputy Commissioners
Mayors of Yellowknife